When Strangers Meet is a 1934 American drama film directed by Christy Cabanne and starring Richard Cromwell, Arline Judge, and Lucien Littlefield. It was released on July 20, 1934.

Cast
 Richard Cromwell as Paul Tarman
 Arline Judge as Ruth Crane
 Lucien Littlefield as Barney Crane
 Charles Middleton as John Tarman
 Hale Hamilton as Captain Manning
 Sarah Padden as Lucy Tarman
 Maude Eburne as Nell Peck
 Barbara Weeks as Elaine
 Sheila Terry as Dolly
 Ray Walker as Steve

References

External links 
 
 
 

Films directed by Christy Cabanne
American mystery drama films
1930s mystery drama films
American black-and-white films
1930s American films